Regina Schüttenhelm (born 9 July 1964) is a German former judoka. She competed in the women's half-heavyweight event at the 1992 Summer Olympics.

References

External links
 

1964 births
Living people
German female judoka
Olympic judoka of Germany
Judoka at the 1992 Summer Olympics
Sportspeople from Siegen